Fenton Records was an American record label of the 1960s, which released a number of singles and a few albums predominantly recorded by Michigan garage rock bands.

Discography

External links
 Official website of The JuJus and Ray Hummel III Records

Discographies of American record labels